Mind Games is the 11th studio album by British blues harmonica player Paul Lamb and his band The King Snakes. This album sees him and his band recording a collection of home-penned numbers and a few blues standards.

Track listing
 "Mind Games" (P. Lamb, R. Lamb, C. Strentz, R. Demick, M. Thorne)
 "Come to the Conclusion" (R. Lamb, C. Strentz)
 "Let Me In" (P. Lamb, R. Lamb)
 "Ya Ya Blues" (L. Dorsey, C. Lewis, M.C. Robinson, M. Levy)
 "Depressing Recession" (C. Strentz)
 "The Pillow" (C. Strentz)
 "Love Another Day" (C. Strentz)
 "Change My Way of Livin'" (P. Lamb)
 "No Matter What You Do" (P. Lamb, R. Lamb, C. Strentz, R. Demick, M. Thorne)
 "If You Lose Your Money" (P. Lamb, Traditional)
 "The Blues Had A Baby" (B. McGhee)
 "Midnight Special" (Traditional)

Personnel
Paul Lamb – Harmonica and vocals
Chad Strentz – Vocals and rhythm guitar
Ryan Lamb – Lead guitar and backing vocals
Rod Demick – Bass guitar and backing vocals
Mike Thorne – Drums and backing vocals

References 

2010 albums
Paul Lamb (musician) albums